Mark Pollock (born 29 February 1976) is an international motivational speaker, explorer, and author from Ireland who became the first blind man to race to the South Pole. As part of a three-man team called South Pole Flag, alongside Simon O'Donnell and Inge Solheim he took 43 days in January 2009 to complete the Amundsen Omega 3 South Pole Race. Pollock asserted his disability had slowed him down but they finished fifth overall from the six teams that finished the race. He had participated against nine other teams, including that of BBC personality Ben Fogle and the Olympic gold medallist James Cracknell, a friend of Pollock. An avid rower Pollock has won bronze and silver medals at the 2002 Commonwealth Rowing Championships in Nottingham, England and has also written a book titled Making It Happen.

Early life and background
Pollock was born to Barbara and Johnny in Holywood, County Down. When Mark was five, he lost the sight of his right eye and was forced during the remainder of his childhood to avoid contact team sports to preserve the vision in his left eye. He was educated at the Royal Belfast Academical Institution where he was a keen rower. In 2002, Pollock graduated from University College Dublin with a Masters of Business Studies. He later studied Business and Economics in Trinity College Dublin, where he became a champion schools rower and captain of the university's rowing club but aged 22 he lost the sight in his left eye and was then suddenly blind. In 2010, just weeks before his wedding, Pollock fell from an upstairs window, breaking his back and fracturing his skull. This caused bleeding on the brain and resulted in paralysis.

Blindness
Pollock has been blind since the age of twenty-two when his left retina became detached. This had a devastating effect on him as he believed at the time that blind people could not have a life which he perceived as normal – that they could not participate in sport, work, study, socialise or date. Before his operation he had been about to embark on a city job in London, UK but after it he was left with no option but to return home to his mother.

Coping

Pollock enrolled in a course to help come to terms with his disability. He left for Dublin with his guide dog Larry and began putting himself forward for job interviews. Prospective employers were uncertain as to how to approach him. Eventually the father of one of his college friends assigned him to organising corporate entertainment. He returned to rowing and won bronze and silver medals for Northern Ireland in the 2002 Commonwealth Rowing Championships. He engaged in other athletic pursuits, including running six marathons in seven days with a sighted partner across the Gobi Desert, China in 2003 when he raised tens of thousands of euro for the charity Sightsavers International. On 10 April 2004, he competed in the North Pole Marathon on the sixth anniversary of his blindness.

To mark the 10th anniversary of blindness Pollock explored the challenge of racing to the South Pole.

Uncertain over whether to make the trip to the South Pole and concerned over the impact of sastrugi on his blindness, Pollock consulted with the explorer Pat Falvey who had completed the journey eighteen months previously.

Writing career
Pollock wrote Making It Happen to detail his struggle with blindness and his attempts at rebuilding his life. This included running numerous marathons, establishing his own business and becoming an international public speaker. It can only be bought online from his website.

South Pole trek
The trek cost Pollock around €250,000. His training included spending time in Norway to acclimatise himself to the sastrugi. Pollock, O'Donnell and Solheim travelled 770 kilometres, averaging fourteen hours journey time each day, whilst lugging 90 kilo sleds behind them. He pulled a 200lb sled for at least twelve hours each day, for a consecutive forty-three days. Temperatures dropped as low as −50C during the expedition, with the team experiencing  blisters, hunger and extreme exhaustion. O'Donnell endured severe frostbite on one ear and fingers and Solheim lost a filling from his tooth due to the extreme temperatures. Pollock told the Irish Independent that they "just can't believe" they had arrived and that they "only started to believe it was possible when we were one hour away, which was an amazing feeling". He described how they did not know what to do when they arrived, describing "such a burst of energy" that had engulfed them.

Pollock returned to Ireland on a 3 February 2009 where he was greeted at Dublin Airport, having been delayed by the extreme weather conditions which gripped Dublin that week.

Television
On 7 February 2009, he appeared on the RTÉ One chat show Tubridy Tonight.

Pollock hosted the documentary series Yes I Can which aired in November 2011 on Setanta Sports.

Paralysis
In July 2010 Mark fell from a second storey window. He broke his back and was left paralysed. Mark is now living his own lessons, deciding how to overcome this second blow. A pioneer, he is exploring the frontiers of spinal cord injury recovery through aggressive physical therapy and robotic technology. In 2015 he sued Enda and Madeline Cahill, his friends and owners of the property he was staying at when he had his fall, claiming the Cahills had disregarded a “reasonably foreseeable risk” of him being seriously injured and that they should have made sure the window remained closed or at least warned Mr Pollock it was open, saying “There was no justification whatsoever to neglect such a risk." The court found the couple liable saying he was “satisfied that the Cahills failed to discharge the common law duty of care they owed as occupiers. The open window was a real risk to Mr Pollock. They created that risk.” Mr Pollock's lawyers confirmed he had limited his claim to a maximum of £2 million, the limit of the Cahills' household insurance, so the couple did not have to pay out themselves.

Project Walk
Pollock has embarked on an ambitious experimental treatment in an effort to overcome his paralysis in cooperation with an innovative treatment centre in California called Project Walk.

Honors and awards
In addition to the honorary degree awarded by Trinity College, Dublin mentioned above, Pollock has been awarded an Honorary Doctorate from Queen's University Belfast, and has been named a Young Global Leader. Mark also was awarded an Honorary Doctorate in 2015 by Royal College of Surgeons in Ireland.

In 2012, Pollock was honored with a Rehab People of the Year Award.

In 2020, Pollock was awarded UCD Alumnus of the Year in Business.

References

External links
 Official site
 Official site
 South Pole blog
 Appearance on Tubridy Tonight
 Yes I Can
 Mark Pollock Also Does Speaking. His Speaking Profile, Videos and Fee Info.

1976 births
Living people
Irish blind people
Irish explorers
Irish motivational speakers
Irish male rowers
20th-century travel writers
Irish travel writers
Kayakers
Male non-fiction writers from Northern Ireland
People from Holywood, County Down
Rowers from Northern Ireland
Male writers from Northern Ireland
21st-century writers from Northern Ireland
21st-century non-fiction writers from Northern Ireland
Irish disabled sportspeople
British autobiographers
British disabled sportspeople
British explorers
British motivational speakers
Autobiographers from Northern Ireland
British male marathon runners